David Maryanayagam Swamidoss Pillat (born 1905 in Vallambury) was an Indian clergyman and prelate for the Roman Catholic Diocese of Vellore. He was appointed bishop in 1956. He died in 1969.

References 

1905 births
1969 deaths
Indian Roman Catholic bishops